Smith Road is a station on the Port Authority of Allegheny County's light rail network, located in Castle Shannon, Pennsylvania. The street level stop is designed as a small commuter stop, serving area residents who walk to the train so they can be taken toward Downtown Pittsburgh.

References

External links 

Port Authority T Stations Listings
Station from Google Maps Street View

Port Authority of Allegheny County stations
Railway stations in the United States opened in 1984
Blue Line (Pittsburgh)
Red Line (Pittsburgh)
Silver Line (Pittsburgh)